The 2012 women's road cycling season was the first for Sengers Ladies Cycling Team (UCI code: SLT).

Roster

Ages as of 1 January 2012.

Season victories

Results in major races

Single day races

Grand Tours

Other achievements

Dutch national record, team pursuit

Vera Koedooder, as part of the national team, broke together with Ellen van Dijk and Kirsten Wild the Dutch team pursuit record at the 2012 Summer Olympics.

UCI World Ranking

The team finished 15th in the UCI ranking for teams.

References

2012 UCI Women's Teams seasons
2012 in Belgian sport
2012 in women's road cycling
Sengers Ladies Cycling Team